The 1952 Divizia B was the 13th season of the second tier of the Romanian football league system.

The format with two series has been maintained, each of them having 12 teams. At the end of the season the winners of the series promoted to Divizia A and no team was relegated to District Championship, because the series would be expanded again from the next season. Also this was the third season played in the spring-autumn system, a system imposed by the new leadership of the country which were in close ties with the Soviet Union.

Team changes

To Divizia B
Promoted from District Championship
 Flacăra Poiana Câmpina
 Flamura Roșie Bacău
 Locomotiva Turnu Severin
 Metalul Oradea

Relegated from Divizia A
 Locomotiva București
 Știința Timișoara

From Divizia B
Relegated to District Championship
 Locomotiva Galați
 Locomotiva Sibiu
 Metalul Reșița

Promoted to Divizia A
 CSA Câmpulung Moldovenesc
 Metalul Câmpia Turzii

Renamed teams 
CSA Cluj was renamed as CA Cluj.

CSA Craiova was renamed as CA Craiova.

Locomotiva București was renamed as Locomotiva GR București.

Locomotiva Satu Mare was renamed as Progresul Satu Mare.

Metalul Sibiu was renamed as Înainte Sibiu.

Other teams 
Flacăra București was moved from Bucharest to Ploiești and renamed as Flacăra Ploiești. This move caused the disappearance of Flacăra Ploiești (former Prahova Ploiești) from the second league. The vacant place was occupied by Flacăra Lupeni, which was spared from relegation.

League tables

Serie I

Serie II

See also 

 1952 Divizia A

References

Liga II seasons
Romania
Romania
2
2